Chrysopilus cristatus,  is a species of 'snipe flies' belonging to the family Rhagionidae. 

This species is present in most of Europe.

The flies are 6 to 8 millimeters long. Similar to Chrysopilus erythrophthalmus, but slightly smaller than this species. The femora are dark grey. The tibia and metatarsus are yellow.

References

 L. Watson and M. J. Dallwitz -  Rhagionidae
 Mark van Veen -  Chrysopilus key

External links
 Biolib
 Fauna Europaea

Rhagionidae
Insects described in 1775
Taxa named by Johan Christian Fabricius
Diptera of Europe